Hiiraan Online (HOL)  is one of the most popular websites dedicated to news and information about Somalia and the Horn of Africa. It was founded in 1999 to deliver news to the growing but underserved Somali diaspora. It has gained recognition for its impartiality and accurate news. It is published in English and Somali as a primary source for Somali news and affairs. It has been described by many as being the most viewed Somali-owned website in the world.

History 
Hiiraan Online was founded in Ottawa, Canada, on July 1, 1999. Its founder, Ahmed Gure, a former airline Captain with Somali Airlines, started the website to serve the growing Somali diaspora.

Content 
The website publishes news articles, opinions, and political commentary and remains one of the most critical and reliable news websites in the Somali media landscape. Hiiraan Online is regularly cited frequently in academia, books and international media. The website hosts external links to the popular daily radio services for BBC Somali and VOA Somali. The website also hosts job advertisements for international bodies, government agencies and NGOs.

Notable contributors 

 Abukar Arman - Political analyst and writer 
 Yusuf Garad - Journalist, former diplomat and politician   
 Ilwad Elman -  Somali Activist 
 Hassan Sheikh Mohamud -  Former Somali President 
 Neil Wigan -  British Diplomat 
 Adam Matan - Social Activist 
 Abdi Ismail Samatar - Somali scholar, writer and professor

Cited by 

 Anadolu Agency - Turkish news agency 
 Al Jazeera - Qatari news channel 
 Face2Face Africa - Media company 
 BBC - British international broadcaster 
 The Guardian -  British newspaper 
 Immigration and Refugee Board of Canada - Government agency 
Chatham House -  Think Tank

References

External links

Mass media in Somalia
Canadian news websites
African news websites
1999 establishments in Ontario
English-language websites
Somali-language websites